HD 11506 is a star in the equatorial constellation of Cetus. It has a yellow hue and can be viewed with a small telescope but is too faint to be visible to the naked eye, having an apparent visual magnitude of 7.51. The distance to this object is 167 light years based on parallax, but it is drifting closer to the Sun with a radial velocity of −7.5 km/s. It has an absolute magnitude of 3.94.

This object is an ordinary G-type main-sequence star with a stellar classification of G0V, which indicates it is generating energy via hydrogen fusion at its core. It is around 1.6 billion years old and is spinning with a projected rotational velocity of 5 km/s. The star has 112% of the mass of the Sun and 106% of the Sun's radius. The spectrum shows a higher than solar abundance of elements other than hydrogen and helium – what astronomers term the metallicity. The star is radiating 117% of the Sun's luminosity from its photosphere at an effective temperature of 5,833 K.

Planetary system
The superjovian planet HD 11506 b was discovered orbiting the star by the N2K Consortium in 2007 using the doppler spectroscopy method. In 2009, a second planet discovery was claimed based on Bayesian analysis of the original data. However, in 2015 additional radial velocity measurements showed that the planetary parameters were significantly different than those determined by Bayesian analysis. An additional linear trend in the radial velocities indicates a stellar or planetary companion on a long term orbit. In 2022, the presence of a third planet with an orbital period of 40 years was confirmed, and the mass and inclination of both planet b and the new planet d were measured via astrometry.

References

G-type main-sequence stars
Planetary systems with two confirmed planets
Cetus (constellation)
Durchmusterung objects
011506
008770